Architecture is the art and science of designing and constructing buildings and other structure for human use and shelter.

Architecture may also refer to:

Design of built environments
 Landscape architecture, the design of man-made land constructs
 Naval architecture, the science of design of water-borne vessels
 Vehicle architecture, an automobile platform common to different vehicles
 Architectural Technology, the application of technology to the design of buildings

Design of process systems
 Process architecture, the design of general process systems (computers, business processes, etc.)
 Enterprise architecture, an architecture, or framework, for aligning an organization's systems
 Enterprise information security architecture, or EISA, the portion of enterprise architecture focused on information security
 Information architecture, the systems architecture for structuring the information flows in a knowledge-based system
 Robotic architectures, the architecture of the hardware and software in robots
 Systems architecture, the representation of an engineered system
 Technical architecture, the technical definition of an engineered system

Computing
 Computer architecture, the systems architecture of a computer
 Hardware architecture, the architecture design of an integrated device
Microarchitecture, processor implementation
 Software architecture, the systems architecture of a software system

Publications
 Architecture (magazine), published by the American Institute of Architects, 1983–2006
 Architecture (magazine, 1900–1936)

Art
 Architecture (Klee), a 1923 painting by Paul Klee

Biology
 Histopathologic architecture, the overall pattern formed by groups of cells
 Cytoarchitecture, the arrangement and interaction of cellular structures in the central nervous system
 Nuclear architecture, the arrangement and organization of chromatin inside the nucleus

Record labels
 Architecture Label, an Australian record label

Other uses
Architecture sometimes refers to:
 Architectural history, studies the evolution and history of architecture
 Architectural analytics
 Product design, or product architecture, the systems design of a product or product family